The 1879 Haddington Burghs by-election was fought on 25 February 1879.  The byelection was fought due to the succession to a peerage of the incumbent Liberal MP, William Hay, 10th Marquess of Tweeddale.  It was won by the Liberal candidate Sir David Wedderburn.

References

1879 in Scotland
1870s elections in Scotland
1879 elections in the United Kingdom
Politics of East Lothian
By-elections to the Parliament of the United Kingdom in Scottish constituencies